Piano Sonata in A minor may refer to:

 Piano Sonata No. 8, K. 310 (Mozart)
 Piano Sonata, D 537 (Schubert)
 Piano Sonata, D 784 (Schubert)
 Piano Sonata, D 845 (Schubert)
 Piano Sonata No. 2 (Szymanowski)
 Piano Sonata No. 3 (Prokofiev)